Andrés Lamas Bervejillo (born 16 January 1984) is an Uruguayan professional footballer who plays as a centre back for Defensor Sporting.

Football career
Born in Montevideo, Lamas started playing professionally with local Defensor Sporting Club, remaining three seasons with the side. In 2007, he joined MKE Ankaragücü in Turkey, helping his team to the eight place in the Süper Lig but being used mostly as a backup.

Afterwards, Lamas moved to Spain and signed for Recreativo de Huelva. He made his La Liga debut on 28 September 2008, playing six minutes in a 0–1 away loss against Andalusia neighbours UD Almería, and again was played sparingly throughout the campaign, with his club eventually being relegated.

On 22 July 2009, Lamas moved to UD Las Palmas in the second division, in a season-long loan. He subsequently returned to Recre, continuing to compete in the Spanish second level but also being sidelined for almost two years after suffering an anterior cruciate ligament injury.

References

External links

1984 births
Living people
Footballers from Montevideo
Uruguayan footballers
Association football defenders
Defensor Sporting players
Liverpool F.C. (Montevideo) players
MKE Ankaragücü footballers
Recreativo de Huelva players
UD Las Palmas players
AD Alcorcón footballers
C.S.D. Independiente del Valle footballers
Barcelona S.C. footballers
Atlético Tucumán footballers
FC Luzern players
Uruguayan Primera División players
Süper Lig players
La Liga players
Segunda División players
Ecuadorian Serie A players
Swiss Super League players
Argentine Primera División  players
Uruguayan expatriate footballers
Expatriate footballers in Turkey
Expatriate footballers in Spain
Expatriate footballers in Ecuador
Expatriate footballers in Switzerland
Expatriate footballers in Argentina
Uruguayan expatriate sportspeople in Spain
Uruguayan expatriate sportspeople in Ecuador
Uruguayan expatriate sportspeople in Switzerland
Uruguayan expatriate sportspeople in Turkey
Uruguayan expatriate sportspeople in Argentina